Franka Potente (born 22 July 1974) is a German actress. She first appeared in the comedy film After Five in the Forest Primeval (1995), for which she won a Bavarian Film Award for Best Young Actress. Her breakthrough came in 1998, when she portrayed the titular role in the acclaimed action thriller Run Lola Run, for which she won a BAMBI Award for Best Actress. She received further critical acclaim and a Bavarian Television Award nomination for her performance in the television film Opernball (also 1998).

After half a decade of well-received roles in German productions, Potente made the transition into Hollywood with her role in the biographical crime film Blow (2001), and achieved wider recognition for her appearances in The Bourne Identity (2002) and The Bourne Supremacy (2004). She portrayed communist revolutionary Tamara Bunke in Che (2008), and psychologist Anita Gregory in The Conjuring 2 (2016). Her other notable films include Anatomy (2000), The Princess and the Warrior (2000), Creep (2004), Romulus, My Father (2007), Eichmann (2007), and Muse (2017).

Potente has starred in the television series Copper (2012–2013), Taboo (2017) and currently, Claws and Titans and Echo 3 in 2022. She also played recurring roles in the second seasons of American Horror Story (2012) and The Bridge (2014).

Early life
The elder of two children, Potente was born in Münster, West Germany, and raised in nearby Dülmen. Her mother, Hildegard, is a medical assistant, and her father, Dieter Potente, is a teacher. Her Italian surname stems from her great-grandfather, a Sicilian slater who migrated to Germany during the 19th century. When she was 17 years old, Potente spent a few months as an exchange student in Humble, a suburb of Houston, Texas.

Career

1990s
After finishing high school in Germany, Potente enrolled at the Otto Falckenberg School of Performing Arts in Munich. Potente took acting jobs outside school time and appeared in her first movie in the 1995 student film Aufbruch. She was then spotted by a casting agent and appeared in the film Nach Fünf im Urwald (After Five in the Forest Primeval), directed by her then-boyfriend, Hans Christian Schmid. She played the role of a 17-year-old girl named Anna who, in search of freedom in an urban environment, runs away from home with a boy who has a crush on her. The film premiered at the 1995 Hof International Film Festival and opened in German theaters on 25 April 1996. She received the 1996 Bavarian Film Award for Young Talent for her work in this film. She subsequently finished her last year of training at the Lee Strasberg Theatre Institute in Manhattan.

Potente returned to Europe and worked in German and French films; her breakthrough came with 1998's Lola rennt (Run Lola Run) after meeting the director, Tom Tykwer, in a café. Specifically written for her persona, her role was that of a woman who needs to obtain 100,000 Deutsche Mark in twenty minutes to save her boyfriend's life. Budgeted at US$1 million, the arthouse thriller was a critical and commercial success, grossing US$14.5 million worldwide. Variety wrote that her performance was "heroic, fierce, frightened and vulnerable all at once", while eFilmCritic.com called her casting a "smart choice". Following her newfound success, she starred opposite Teemu Aromaa in Downhill City (1999), a small-scale drama directed by Finnish director Hannu Salonen, and in the romantic comedy Bin ich schön?, about people having trouble with love and identity, which was released on 17 September 1999 in Germany.

2000s

In the German-language horror film Anatomy (2000), she starred as a medical student who wins a place at an exclusive Heidelberg medical school, where she uncovers a gruesome conspiracy by a secret Anti-Hippocratic society. The film was a box office success in Germany, grossing US$10.5 million domestically, and Variety, in its review for the film, remarked: "Boasting a gutsy performance from sturdy young German star Franka Potente (Run Lola Run), Anatomy is creepy, sometimes gruesome, widescreen fun that pushes all the right buttons. Out-performing Scream at the local [box office] and the biggest German pic of the year so far, this is natural latenight/fantasy fest fare that could become a cult item on half-inch and possibly even theatrically". Also in 2000, she had the starring role in the romantic drama The Princess and the Warrior, directed by Tykwer, her Run Lola Run director. In the film, she portrayed a psychiatric hospital nurse who, after a near-death experience, enters into a relationship with an anguished former soldier (Benno Fürmann, also her co-star in Anatomy) who lapses into criminality. The independent film was favorably received by critics; eFilmCritic stated that Potente "proves her versatility as an actress here with a much more subdued character, but is still capable of delivering powerhouse emotional scenes", while the consensus of review-aggregator website Rotten Tomatoes was: "More slow-moving than Run Lola Run, this film nonetheless offers an intriguing storyline about love and fate". She received nominations for the European Film Award and the German Film Award for Best Actress.

Potente's first English-language role was that of an airline stewardess who becomes engaged to cocaine smuggler George Jung in the biographical crime film Blow, alongside Johnny Depp. The film received mixed reviews, while it grossed US$83.2 million worldwide. She played a film editor in the controversial independent drama Storytelling (2001), with Leo Fitzpatrick and Selma Blair. It premiered at the 2001 Cannes Film Festival, and received a limited release in most international markets. Potente next found a much wider recognition from audiences for her performance in The Bourne Identity (2002), co-starring Matt Damon. In the film, she played a European woman who grows closer to the titular character, a man suffering from extreme memory loss and attempting to discover his true identity amidst a clandestine conspiracy within the Central Intelligence Agency. A positive critical reception greeted the film upon its release, and budgeted at US$60 million, it grossed US$214 million globally. After her role in the film, she starred in the American films All I Want (2002) and I Love Your Work (2003), and in the German production Blueprint (2003).

She briefly reprised her role in the German horror sequel Anatomy 2 (2003), and also took on for the second time her part in The Bourne Supremacy (2004), which made US$288.5 million around the globe. In 2004, she starred in the British-German horror film Creep, as a woman locked in the London Underground overnight who finds herself being stalked by a hideously deformed killer living in the sewers below. Despite mixed reviews, the film grossed US$3.2 million in UK cinemas. ViewLondon wrote: "The performances are good, particularly Potente, who avoids scream queen clichés by making her character surprisingly unlikeable – Kate is rude and arrogant in her early scenes and the fact that she's German is, of course, a coincidence."

In 2006, Potente appeared in the German coming-of-age drama Elementarteilchen (Atomised), based on the novel Les Particules élémentaires by Michel Houellebecq and directed by Oskar Roehler. She wrote and directed Der die Tollkirsche ausgräbt, a silent also released in 2006. She next starred with Eric Bana and Kodi Smit-McPhee in the Australian drama film Romulus, My Father (2007), about the struggle of a couple to raise their son amid great adversity. For her portrayal, she was nominated for an Australian Film Industry Award for Best Lead Actress. Starting in May 2007, Potente had a three-episode recurring arc in the FX drama The Shield, where she played Diro Kesakhian, "the ruthless godmother of L.A.'s Armenian mafia". Also in 2007, she appeared in Eichmann (2007), a biographical film detailing the interrogation of Adolf Eichmann.

In Che (2008), a two-part biopic about Argentine Marxist revolutionary Ernesto "Che" Guevara, Potente took on the role of communist revolutionary Tamara Bunke. She described the film as "really epic and [...] very emotional", during an interview with Vulture magazine. The film, first screened at the Cannes Film Festival, garnered a positive critical response while it made US$40.9 million worldwide. The New Yorker, pointing out Potente, remarked that "[m]ajor figures come and go, diverting the plot without registering much of an impact", and The Hollywood Reporter described her part as a "small role" and felt that the actress "seems utterly uncomfortable in every scene". In 2009, she appeared in the House television series two-part episode "Broken".

2010s
Potente filmed the American neo-noir film Shanghai in Bangkok, Thailand, with production wrapping in August 2008. The film, set in the 1940s Chinese spy world, was released on 9 June 2010 in China, and on 2 October 2015 in North America. In 2011, she played the leading role of a passenger in the drama The Sinking of the Laconia, about the Laconia incident. The two-part television film first aired in January 2011 on BBC Two.

Potente starred in BBC America's first original scripted series, Copper, as Eva Heissen, a shrewd German-American businesswoman and the madam of a brothel in the Five Points district of New York City during the American Civil War. The show premiered on 9 August 2012 and had the largest debut in the network's history. It was subsequently renewed for a second season, but the BBC announced its cancellation following its finale. Potente subsequently had a two-episode appearance in American Horror Story: Asylum, as a woman who claims to be Holocaust victim and diarist Anne Frank.

In 2014, Potente landed a role on the second season of the FX series The Bridge as Eleanor Nacht, a "fixer" for the cartel. She returned to the big screen in the horror sequel The Conjuring 2 as real-life German-British parapsychologist Anita Gregory, who investigated the Enfield Poltergeist case in the late 20th century. The Hollywood Reporter found her to be "curiously sidelined for much of the action", but with a worldwide gross of US$320.3 million, it emerged as Potente's most widely seen film. Also in 2016, she obtained the two-episode role of a "calculated and determined" Chief Inspector in the second season of the Canadian supernatural series Dark Matter, and in 2017, she was cast in a supporting role in the BBC period drama series Taboo, alongside Tom Hardy.

2020s
In 2020, she made her first feature film Home, for which she was also responsible for the screenplay. The film premiered in October 2020.

In 2022, Potente appeared in season four of Titans where she portrayed Mother Mayhem.

Authored works
Based on Potente's correspondence with colleague Max Urlacher during his time in Los Angeles, a book entitled Los Angeles – Berlin was published in September 2005. In May 2009, Potente published her second book Kick Ass – An Alternative Workout, co-written with her personal trainer Karsten Schellenberg. In August 2010 her first volume of stories "Zehn" was published.

Personal life
After relationships with German film director Tom Tykwer and American actor Elijah Wood, among others, Potente married American actor Derek Richardson in mid 2012, in a private ceremony. The couple live in Los Angeles, and have two daughters, born in 2011 and 2013.

Filmography

Film

Television

Video games

Discography
 Believe (1998)
 Wish (Komm zu mir) (1998)
 Easy Day (1999)
 Fly with Me (2001)

Bibliography
 2005: Los Angeles – Berlin. Ein Jahr
 2006: Der die Tollkirsche ausgräbt, Drehbuch zum Film
 2009: Kick Ass – Das alternative Workout
 2010: Zehn: Stories
 2014: Almählich wird es Tag

Awards and nominations

References

External links

 
 
 

1974 births
20th-century German actresses
21st-century German actresses
German people of Italian descent
German expatriates in the United States
German film actresses
German television actresses
German people of Sicilian descent
Lee Strasberg Theatre and Film Institute alumni
MTV Europe Music Award winners
Living people
People from Münster